In 1960, the United States FBI, under Director J. Edgar Hoover, continued for an eleventh year to maintain a public list of the people it regarded as the Ten Most Wanted Fugitives.

As 1960 began, seven of the ten places on the list remained filled by these elusive long-time fugitives, then still at large:

 1950 #14 (ten years), Frederick J. Tenuto remained at large
 1952 #36 (eight years), James Eddie Diggs remained at large
 1954 #78 (six years), David Daniel Keegan remained at large
 1956 #97 (four years), Eugene Francis Newman remained at large
 1958 #107 (two years), Angelo Luigi Pero process dismissed December 2, 1960
 1959 #112 (one year), Edwin Sanford Garrison arrested September 9, 1960
 1959 #116 (eight months), Billy Owens Williams arrested March 4, 1960

This would be a very successful year for capturing fugitives from the Ten Most Wanted list, clearing space for new fugitives to be added to the list.  As a result, the FBI was able to add 22 new fugitives to the list over the course of the year, the highest since the 24 additions in the still (as of 2013) record year of 1953.

1960 Fugitives

The Ten Most Wanted Fugitives listed by the FBI in 1960 include (in FBI list appearance sequence order):

Kenneth Ray Lawson
January 4, 1960 #124
Two months on the list
Kenneth Ray Lawson – U.S. prisoner arrested March 17, 1960, in Laredo, Texas

Ted Jacob Rinehart
January 25, 1960 #125
Two months on the list
Ted Jacob Rinehart – U.S. prisoner arrested March 6, 1960, in Granada Hills, California, after a citizen recognized
him from a wanted flyer. Rinehart told Agents he learned of his addition to the "Top Ten" list while watching a local television show.

Charles Clyatt Rogers
March 18, 1960 #126
Two months on the list
Charles Clyatt Rogers – U.S. prisoner arrested May 11, 1960, in Minneapolis, Minnesota, while standing in a soup line at
a Salvation Army center. He was recognized by a police officer who collected FBI wanted posters.

Joseph Corbett, Jr.
March 30, 1960 #127
Seven months on the list
Joseph Corbett, Jr. – paroled in 1987; was sentenced to life; was a U.S. and Canadian prisoner arrested October 29, 1960, in Vancouver, British Columbia, by Canadian police after two Canadian citizens recognized him from a November 1960 Reader's Digest article; was wanted for the kidnap and subsequent murder of wealthy heir Adolph Coors III

William Mason
April 6, 1960 #128
Three weeks on the list
William Mason (fugitive) – U.S. prisoner arrested April 27, 1960, in Milwaukee, Wisconsin

Edward Reiley
May 10, 1960 #129
Three weeks on the list
Edward Reiley – U.S. prisoner arrested May 24, 1960, in Rockford, Illinois, by the local sheriff after an auto
salesman recognized Reiley from a wanted flyer. Upon arrest he pleaded, "Don't shoot! I'm the guy you want."

Harold Eugene Fields
May 25, 1960 #130
Four months on the list
Harold Eugene Fields – U.S. prisoner arrested September 5, 1960, in Schererville, Indiana. Fields told arresting FBI Agents his place on the "Top Ten" list convinced him his days of freedom were numbered and his apprehension came as no surprise.

Richard Peter Wagner
June 23, 1960 #131
Two days on the list
Richard Peter Wagner – U.S. prisoner arrested June 25, 1960, in Ray, Minnesota, after a citizen recognized him from a
newspaper article. An expert woodsman, Wagner had been serving as a guide at a hunting and fishing lodge where he was captured.

James John Warjac
July 19, 1960 #132
Three days on the list
James John Warjac – U.S. prisoner arrested July 22, 1960, in Los Angeles, California

Ernest Tait
August 16, 1960 #133
One month on the list, was earlier Fugitive #23 in 1951
Ernest Tait – U.S. prisoner arrested September 10, 1960, in Denver, Colorado; 2nd appearance on the list, was also Fugitive #23 in 1951, had been arrested July 12, 1951, in Miami, Florida

Clarence Leon Raby
August 19, 1960 #134
One week on the list
Clarence Leon Raby – U.S. prisoner surrendered August 28, 1960, to local authorities at his parents’ home in Heiskell, Tennessee

Nathaniel Beans
September 12, 1960 #135
Three weeks on the list
Nathaniel Beans – U.S. prisoner arrested September 30, 1960, in Buffalo, New York, by a police officer who recognized
Beans from a magazine photograph

Stanley William Fitzgerald
September 20, 1960 #136
Two days on the list
Stanley William Fitzgerald – U.S. prisoner arrested September 22, 1960, in Portland, Oregon, by the FBI after a citizen recognized him from a photograph in a newspaper

Donald Leroy Payne
October 6, 1960 #137
Five years on the list
Donald Leroy Payne – PROCESS DISMISSED November 26, 1965, in Houston, Texas, by local authorities

Charles Francis Higgins
October 10, 1960 #138
One week on the list
Charles Francis Higgins – U.S. prisoner arrested October 17, 1960, in Kirkwood, Missouri, by local police after an officer
recognized him from a newspaper photograph

Robert William Schultz, Jr.
October 12, 1960 #139
One month on the list
Robert William Schultz, Jr. – U.S. prisoner arrested November 4, 1960, in Orlando, Florida

Merle Lyle Gall
October 17, 1960 #140
Three months on the list
Merle Lyle Gall – U.S. prisoner arrested January 18, 1961, in Scottsdale, Arizona

James George Economou
October 31, 1960 #141
Five months on the list
James George Economou – U.S. prisoner arrested March 22, 1961, in Los Angeles, California, after a tip from an informant

Ray Delano Tate
November 18, 1960 #142
One week on the list
Ray Delano Tate – U.S. prisoner surrendered November 25, 1960, to the New York city editor of the New York Daily Mirror newspaper. He was taken into custody immediately by FBI Agents.

John B. Everhart
November 22, 1960 #143
three years on the list
John B. Everhart – U.S. prisoner arrested November 6, 1963, in San Francisco, California, while painting a house

Herbert Hoover Huffman
December 19, 1960 #144
One week on the list
Herbert Hoover Huffman – U.S. prisoner apprehended December 29, 1960, in Cleveland, Ohio, after a fellow worker recognized him from a wanted poster

Kenneth Eugene Cindle
December 23, 1960 #145
Four months on the list
Kenneth Eugene Cindle – U.S. prisoner apprehended April 1, 1961, in Cochran County, Texas, after a local farmer saw
his photograph on television, and recognized him as a hitchhiker he had picked up earlier that day; he had been hitchhiking across the county and working odd jobs to avoid apprehension

See also

Later entries
FBI Ten Most Wanted Fugitives, 2020s
FBI Ten Most Wanted Fugitives, 2010s
FBI Ten Most Wanted Fugitives, 2000s
FBI Ten Most Wanted Fugitives, 1990s
FBI Ten Most Wanted Fugitives, 1980s
FBI Ten Most Wanted Fugitives, 1970s
FBI Ten Most Wanted Fugitives, 1960s

Prior entries
FBI Ten Most Wanted Fugitives, 1950s

External links
Current FBI top ten most wanted fugitives at FBI site

1960 in the United States